The Scottish Football Association Challenge Cup, commonly known as the Scottish Cup, is a knockout cup competition in Scottish football. Organised by the Scottish Football Association, it is the third oldest existing football competition in the world, having commenced in the 1873–74 season just two years after the first FA Cup. The winners are awarded the world's oldest trophy, minted in 1885.

Celtic hold the record for most wins with 40, and the most final appearances with 59. Rangers are the current holders, having beaten Heart of Midlothian 2–0 in the 2022 final.

History
At the time of the cup's first season Queen's Park were by far the dominant force in Scottish football, and no other team had even managed to score a goal against them until 1875, eight years after their formation. This early dominance meant they were invited into the first FA Cup season and in season 1883–84 they came close to a cup double, winning the Scottish Cup but losing the FA Cup Final to Blackburn Rovers. They again met Blackburn Rovers in the following season's Final but were defeated once again. Other Scottish teams competed in the FA Cup such as Partick Thistle and 3rd Lanark RV and continued to compete until 1887, when the Scottish Football Association banned its members from taking any further part in the "English Cup". By the time the Scottish Football League was founded in the 1890–91 season Queen's Park had been eclipsed by many of the league clubs, they finally agreed to enter the competition in the 1900–01 season, they finished seventh in their first season. Their demise was reflected in their Scottish Cup results, although they reached four finals after the foundation of the league they could only win one and their 1893 success was their last, reaching only one more final in 1900. Dumbarton filled the void left by Queen's Park for a time but like all Scottish football competitions the Scottish Cup would come to be dominated by the Old Firm of Celtic and Rangers.

In 1909 the cup was withheld by the SFA after a riot broke out following a replay between Rangers and Celtic. The first match was drawn 2–2 and the second 1–1.

The cup was not competed for between 1914 and 1919 due to World War I. World War II prevented competition between 1939 and 1945 although the Scottish War Emergency Cup was held in the 1939–40 season.

Results

A draw in the final used to result in the match being replayed at a later date. Since the 1981 final, however, the result has always been decided on the day, with a penalty shootout if required after extra time.

Key

Results

Performance by club

By city/town

See also
List of Scottish League Cup finals
List of Scottish football champions
Football records in Scotland

Notes

References

External links
Scotland – List of Cup Finals at RSSSF

 
Finals
Cup Finals
Annual events in Glasgow
Scottish Cup